Physconia is a genus of lichen-forming fungi in the family Physciaceae. It has about 25 species. The genus was circumscribed by Czech lichenologist Josef Poelt in 1965, with Physconia pulverulenta assigned as the type species.

Species
Physconia californica 
Physconia chinensis 
Physconia distorta 
Physconia enteroxantha 
Physconia fallax 
Physconia grisea 
Physconia jacutica 
Physconia labrata 
Physconia muscigena 
Physconia perisidiosa 
Physconia pulverulenta 
Physconia rossica 
Physconia sikkimensis 
Physconia thorstenii

References

Caliciales
Lichen genera
Caliciales genera
Taxa described in 1965
Taxa named by Josef Poelt